The University of Technology, Jamaica (UTech, Ja.),  formerly the College of Arts, Science and Technology, is a public university in Jamaica.

History 
The university was founded as the Jamaica Institute of Technology in 1958. The following year it was incorporated as the College of Arts, Science and Technology (CAST), and was formally recognised by an Act of Parliament in 1964. It was granted degree awarding powers in 1986 and a governing council and academic board were established. The college gained university status, under its current name, on 1 September 1995, and permanent provision for the university was made by the University of Technology, Jamaica Act 27, which became law on 29 June 1999.

From just over 50 students and four programmes in 1958, UTech, Ja has grown to become one of the top tertiary education institutions in Jamaica, with a student population of over 12,000. It now offers more than 90 programmes at the certificate, diploma and degree levels through its five faculties and three colleges.

Academics 

The University of Technology offers courses across eight colleges and faculties:

 College of Business & Management (COBAM)
 College of Health Sciences (COHS)
 Faculty of Education & Liberal Studies (FELS)
 Faculty of Engineering & Computing (FENC)
 Faculty of Law (FOL)
 Faculty of Science & Sport (FOSS)
 Faculty of The Built Environment (FOBE)
 Joint Colleges of Medicine, Oral Health & Veterinary Sciences

Degrees of the university are either currently accredited or have been granted Candidacy for Accreditation status by the University Council of Jamaica. BArch and MArch degrees are additionally accredited by the Commonwealth Association of Architects.

Campuses 

The University of Technology, Jamaica currently has four campuses:

 Papine Campus
 Slipe Pen Road Campus
 Arthur Wint Drive Campus 
Western Campus

Programmes 
This institution offers over 100 programmes in various colleges and faculties. These are the College of Business and Management, the College of Health Sciences, the Colleges of Oral Health Sciences, the Faculty of the Built Environment, the Faculty of Science and Sport, the Faculty of Engineering and Computing, the Faculty of Education and Liberal Studies, and the Faculty of Law. The UTech Academy offers pre-university and all pre-graduate courses and programmes.

Courses are offered at the certificate, diploma, undergraduate, and post-graduate degree levels.

College of Business and Management 

The College of Business and Management comprises the Schools of Business Administration and Hospitality and Tourism Management, the Joan Duncan School of Ethics, Entrepreneurship and Leadership, and the UTech/JIM School of Advanced Management.

College of Health Sciences 
Comprises the School of Allied Health and Nursing, the School of Pharmacy, School of Public Health and Health Technology and the Institute of Health and Medical Sciences.

Faculty of Science and Sport 
Consists of the School of Natural and Applied Sciences, School of Mathematics and Statistics, Caribbean School of Sport Sciences and Centre of Science-based Research, Entrepreneurship and Continuing Studies.

Faculty of the Built Environment 
Consists of the School of Building and Land Management and the Caribbean School of Architecture, the only architectural school in the English-speaking Caribbean.

Faculty of Engineering and Computing 
The Schools of Computing and Information Technology and Engineering fall within the Faculty of Engineering and Computing.

Faculty of Education and Liberal Studies  
Contains the programmes of the School of Humanities and Social Sciences and the School of Technical and Vocational Education.

Notable faculty and administrators

Stephen Vasciannie:  Past President, Formerly Deputy Solicitor-General and Principal of the Norman Manley Law School, former Jamaica's Ambassador Extraordinary Plenipotentiary to the United States 2012 - 2015.
Edward Seaga:  Current Chancellor,  fifth Prime Minister of Jamaica, from 1980 to 1989, and the leader of the Jamaica Labour Party from 1974 to 2005.

Notable alumni
 Usain Bolt: Jamaican retired sprinter and world record holder in the 100 metres, 200 metres and 4 × 100 metres relay. 
 Shelly-Ann Fraser-Pryce: Jamaican sprinter, Two-time Olympic gold medallist and four-time world champion in the 100 meters.
 Elaine Thompson-Herah: female Jamaican Olympic sprinter and 5 time Olympic gold medalist
 Sean Paul: Jamaican dancehall rapper, singer and record producer.
 Delroy Slowley: member of parliament

References

External links
 
 Aerial view

Universities in Jamaica
Educational institutions established in 1958
University of Technology
Buildings and structures in Kingston, Jamaica
1958 establishments in Jamaica